Pandaemonium is a 2000 film, directed by Julien Temple, screenplay by Frank Cottrell Boyce. It is based on the early lives of English poets Samuel Taylor Coleridge and William Wordsworth, in particular their collaboration on the Lyrical Ballads (1798), and Coleridge's writing of Kubla Khan  (completed in 1797, published in 1816).

Much of the film was shot on location on and around the Quantock Hills in Somerset.

Cast

 Linus Roache as Samuel Taylor Coleridge
 John Hannah as William Wordsworth
 Samantha Morton as Sara Fricker Coleridge (Coleridge's wife)
 Emily Woof as Dorothy Wordsworth
 Samuel West as Robert Southey
 Andy Serkis as John Thelwall
 Andrea Lowe as Edith Southey
 Clive Merrison as Dr. Gillman

Reception

Release Dates

Accolades

"It's rattling good stuff. There's just one small objection. None of it ever happened. This is fantasy literary history". John Sutherland.

References

External links

 
 Pandaemonium at Box Office Mojo
 Pandaemonium at BBFC

 
 The Guardian review
 New York Times review

2000 films
2000 drama films
British historical drama films
Films scored by Dario Marianelli
Films about poets
Films directed by Julien Temple
Films set in the 18th century
Films set in the Lake District
Films shot in Somerset
Films with screenplays by Frank Cottrell-Boyce
Samuel Taylor Coleridge
William Wordsworth
Biographical films about poets
2000s English-language films
2000s British films